Bradley P. Beaulieu is an American author of epic fantasy. He is best known for his series The Lays of Anuskaya, which he finished in 2013 with the publication of The Flames of Shadam Khoreh. In 2015 Beaulieu published Twelve Kings in Sharakhai, the first novel in his series The Song of the Shattered Sands.

Beaulieu started writing in college and has since been nominated for several awards, including the Gemmell Morningstar Award for The Winds of Khalakovo. He dedicated himself to the craft, learning under the guidance of writers like Nancy Kress, Joe Haldeman, Tim Powers, Holly Black, Michael Swanwick, Kij Johnson, and many more.

Bibliography

The Lays of Anuskaya
 The Winds of Khalakovo (Night Shade Books) April 2011
 The Straits of Galahesh (Night Shade Books) April 2012
 The Flames of Shadam Khoreh (Quillings Literary) April 2013

The Song of the Shattered Sands
 Twelve Kings in Sharakhai (DAW Books US, Gollancz UK) 2015
 Of Sand and Malice Made (DAW Books US, Gollancz UK) 2016
 With Blood Upon the Sand (DAW Books US, Gollancz UK) 2017
 A Veil of Spears (DAW Books US, Gollancz UK) 2018
 Beneath the Twisted Trees (DAW Books US, Gollancz UK) 2019
 When Jackals Storm the Walls (DAW Books US, Gollancz UK) 2020 
 A Desert Torn Asunder (DAW Books US, Gollancz UK) 2021

Novellas
 The Doors at Dusk and Dawn
 In the Village Where Brightwine Flows
 The Tattered Prince and the Demon Veiled
 A Wasteland of My God’s Own Making
 The Flight of the Whispher King

Co-written
 The Burning Light, with Rob Ziegler (2016)
 Strata, with Stephen Gaskell (2011)

References

External links
 Official website of Bradley Beaulieu

Living people
American fantasy writers
21st-century American male writers
Year of birth missing (living people)